Bethel is a surname. Notable people with the surname include:

Wilson Bethel (born Feb 24, 1984), American actor, best known from "Hart of Dixie"
Judy Bethel (born 1943), former member of the Canadian House of Commons
Lorraine Bethel, African American lesbian feminist poet and author
McLeod Bethel-Thompson, American quarterback.
Nicolette Bethel, Director of Culture in the Bahamas
Paulette Bethel, Ambassador/Permanent Representative of the Bahamas to the United Nations
Pepsi Bethel (1918–2002), jazz dancer and choreographer

See also:

Ernest Bethell, British journalist who worked in Korea under Japanese rule.  His name is sometimes misspelt Bethel.

Anglicised Welsh-language surnames